The X-Men are a superhero team appearing in American comic books published by Marvel Comics. Created by artist/co-plotter Jack Kirby and writer/editor Stan Lee, the team first appearing in The X-Men #1 (September 1963). Although initially cancelled in 1970 due to low sales, following its 1975 revival and subsequent direction under writer Chris Claremont, it became one of the most recognizable and successful franchises of Marvel Comics. They have appeared in numerous books, television shows, the 20th Century Fox X-Men films, and video games. The X-Men title may refer to the superhero team itself, the eponymous comic series, or the broader franchise including various solo titles and team books such as the New Mutants, Excalibur, and X-Force.
This team of heroes marks a striking resemblance to another superhero team conceived by DC Comics called Doom Patrol, that released three months prior to release of the X-Men.

In the Marvel Universe, mutants are humans who are born with a genetic trait called the X-gene which grants them natural superhuman abilities. They gain this ability or abilities usually during puberty. Due to their differences from the majority of humanity, mutants are subject to prejudice and discrimination and many X-Men stories feature social commentary on bigotry and justice. The X-Men have fought against a variety of enemies, including villainous mutants, human bigots, supervillains, mystical threats, extraterrestrials, and malevolent artificial intelligences. In most iterations of the team, they are led by their founder Charles "Professor X" Xavier, a powerful telepath who runs a school for mutant children out of his mansion in Westchester, New York, which secretly is also the headquarters of the X-Men. Their stories have frequently involved Magneto, a powerful mutant with control over magnetic fields, who is depicted as an old friend of and foil to Xavier, variously acting as an adversary or as an ally.

The current iteration of the official X-Men team is headquartered in The Treehouse, a Krakoan base in New York City, and the roster is voted on by their fellow mutants in elections held at periodic Hellfire Galas. No longer working in secret, they fight publicly for the safety of mutants, to build bridges between Krakoa and human nations, and to protect the Earth and Solar System from extraterrestrial threats.

Background and creation
In 1963, with the success of Spider-Man, the Hulk, Thor, Iron Man, and the Fantastic Four, co-creator Stan Lee wanted to create another group of superheroes but did not want to have to explain how they got their powers. In 2004, Lee recalled, "I couldn't have everybody bitten by a radioactive spider or exposed to a gamma ray explosion. And I took the cowardly way out. I said to myself, 'Why don't I just say they're mutants? They are born that way.

In a 1987 interview, Kirby said:

The X-Men, I did the natural thing there. What would you do with mutants who were just plain boys and girls and certainly not dangerous? You school them. You develop their skills. So I gave them a teacher, Professor X. Of course, it was the natural thing to do, instead of disorienting or alienating people who were different from us, I made the X-Men part of the human race, which they were. Possibly, radiation, if it is beneficial, may create mutants that'll save us instead of doing us harm. I felt that if we train the mutants our way, they'll help us – and not only help us, but achieve a measure of growth in their own sense. And so, we could all live together.

Lee devised the series title after Marvel publisher Martin Goodman turned down the initial name, "The Mutants," stating that readers would not know what a "mutant" was.

Within the Marvel Universe, the X-Men are widely regarded to have been named after Professor Xavier himself. The original explanation for the name, as provided by Xavier in The X-Men #1 (1963), is that mutants "possess an extra power ... one which ordinary humans do not!! That is why I call my students ... X-Men, for EX-tra power!"

DC Comics's Doom Patrol, which debuted several months before X-Men, was suspected by its creator Arnold Drake and its fans of having had the basic concept copied to a great degree - including a wheel-chair bound leader - by Marvel Comics to create the X-Men. Other fans also speculate that Doom Patrol share similarities with another Marvel superhero team that preceded them, the Fantastic Four.

Publication history

Original run 

Early X-Men issues introduced the original team composed of Cyclops, Marvel Girl, Beast, Angel, and Iceman, along with their archenemy Magneto and his Brotherhood of Evil Mutants featuring Mastermind, Quicksilver,  Scarlet Witch, and Toad. The comic focused on a common human theme of good versus evil and later included storylines and themes about prejudice and racism, all of which have persisted throughout the series in one form or another. The evil side in the fight was shown in human form and under some sympathetic beginnings via Magneto, a character who was later revealed to have survived Nazi concentration camps only to pursue a hatred for normal humanity. His key followers, Quicksilver and the Scarlet Witch, were Romani. Only one new member of the X-Men was added, Mimic/Calvin Rankin, but soon left due to his temporary loss of power.

The title lagged in sales behind Marvel's other comic franchises. In 1969, writer Roy Thomas and illustrator Neal Adams rejuvenated the comic book and gave regular roles to two recently introduced characters: Havok/Alex Summers (who had been introduced by Roy Thomas before Adams began work on the comic) and Lorna Dane, later called Polaris (created by Arnold Drake and Jim Steranko). However, these later X-Men issues failed to attract sales and Marvel stopped producing new stories with issue #66, later reprinting a number of the older comics as issues #67–93.

Claremont Era 

In Giant-Size X-Men #1 (1975), writer Len Wein and artist Dave Cockrum introduced a new team that starred in a revival of The X-Men, beginning with issue #94. This new team replaced the previous members with the exception of Cyclops, who remained. This team differed greatly from the original. Unlike in the early issues of the original series, the new team was not made up of teenagers and they also had a more diverse background. Marvel's corporate owners, Cadence Industries, had suggested the new team should be international, feeling it needed characters with "foreign appeal". So each character was from a different country with varying cultural and philosophical beliefs, and all were already well-versed in using their mutant powers, several being experienced in combat.

The "all-new, all-different X-Men" were led by Cyclops, from the original team, and consisted of the newly created Colossus (from the Soviet Union/Russia), Nightcrawler (from West Germany/Germany), Storm (from Kenya), and Thunderbird (a Native American of Apache descent), and three previously introduced characters: Banshee (from Ireland), Sunfire (from Japan), and Wolverine (from Canada). Wolverine eventually became the breakout character on the team and, in terms of comic sales and appearances, the most popular X-Men character, even getting his own solo title. However, this team would not remain whole for long; Sunfire, who never really accepted the other members, quit shortly after their first mission, and Thunderbird died on the next. Filling in the vacancy, a revamped Jean Grey soon rejoined the X-Men under her new persona of "Phoenix". Angel, Beast, Iceman, Havok, and Polaris also made significant guest appearances.

The revived series was illustrated by Cockrum, and later by John Byrne, and written by Chris Claremont. Claremont became the series' longest-running contributor. The run met with critical acclaim and produced such landmark storylines as the death of Thunderbird, the emergence of Phoenix, the saga of the Starjammers and the M'Kraan Crystal, the introduction of Alpha Flight and the Proteus saga. Other characters introduced during this time include Amanda Sefton, Mystique, and Moira MacTaggert, with her genetic research facility on Muir Island.

The 1980s began with the comic's best-known story arc, the Dark Phoenix Saga, which saw Phoenix manipulated by the illusionist Mastermind and becoming corrupted with an overwhelming lust for power and destruction as the evil Dark Phoenix. Other important storylines included Days of Future Past, the saga of Deathbird and the Brood, the discovery of the Morlocks, the invasion of the Dire Wraiths and The Trial of Magneto!, as well as X-Men: God Loves, Man Kills, the partial inspiration for 20th Century Fox's movie X2: X-Men United, which was released on May 2, 2003.

By the early 1980s, X-Men was Marvel's top-selling comic title. Its sales were such that distributors and retailers began using an "X-Men index", rating each comic book publication by how many orders it garnered compared to that month's issue of X-Men. The growing popularity of Uncanny X-Men and the rise of comic book specialty stores led to the introduction of a number of ongoing spin-off series nicknamed "X-Books." The first of these was The New Mutants, soon followed by Alpha Flight, X-Factor, Excalibur, and a solo Wolverine title. When Claremont conceived a story arc, the Mutant Massacre, which was too long to run in the monthly X-Men, editor Louise Simonson decided to have it overlap into several X-Books. The story was a major financial success, and when the later Fall of the Mutants was similarly successful, the marketing department declared that the X-Men lineup would hold such crossovers annually.

Throughout the decade, Uncanny X-Men was written solely by Chris Claremont, and illustrated for long runs by John Byrne, Dave Cockrum, Paul Smith, John Romita Jr., and Marc Silvestri. Additions to the X-Men during this time were Kitty Pryde/Shadowcat, Rogue, Jean Grey/Phoenix, Psylocke, Dazzler, Longshot, Jubilee, Forge and Gambit. In a controversial move, Professor X relocated to outer space to be with Lilandra Neramani, Majestrix of the Shi'ar Empire, in 1986. Magneto then joined the X-Men in Xavier's place and became the director of the New Mutants. This period also included the emergence of the Hellfire Club, the arrival of the mysterious Madelyne Pryor, and the villains Apocalypse, Mister Sinister, Mojo, and Sabretooth.

X-Men
 Uncanny X-Men, vol. 1 (flagship) – a team of young mutants with superhuman abilities led and taught by Professor X (1963–1970); the team expanded when Xavier recruited mutants from around the world (1975–1985); a reformed Magneto became the headmaster after Xavier had left Earth (1985–1988); the team later relocated to the Australian Outback after the events of The Fall of the Mutants (1988–1989); after the X-Men is disassembled, the team reformed to fight the mutant-rights abuse of Genosha (1991).
 X-Factor, vol. 1 – the Original Five set up a business advertised as mutant-hunters for hire, and secretly trained the captured mutants to control their powers and reintegrate them into society (1986–1991).
 Excalibur, vol. 1 – Nightcrawler, Shadowcat and Rachel Grey teamed up with Captain Britain and Meggan to form a group of mutants based in Europe after the apparent death of the X-Men during The Fall of the Mutants (1988–1992).
 X-Men in Training
 New Mutants, vol. 1 – a group of teenaged students of the School for Gifted Youngsters gathered by Professor X
Other Teams
 Alpha Flight, vol. 1 – Canada's premiere team of super-heroes organized under the auspices of the Canadian government's Department H.

Blue and Gold 

In 1991, Marvel revised the entire lineup of X-Men comic book titles, centered on the launch of a second X-Men series, simply titled X-Men. With the return of Xavier and the original X-Men to the team, the roster was split into two strike forces: Cyclops's "Blue Team" (chronicled in X-Men) and Storm's "Gold Team" (in The Uncanny X-Men).

The first issues of the second X-Men series were written by Claremont and drawn and co-plotted by Jim Lee. Retailers pre-ordered over 8.1 million copies of issue #1, generating and selling nearly $7 million (though retailers probably sold closer to 3 million copies), making it, according to Guinness Book of World Records, the best-selling comic book of all-time. Guinness presented honors to Claremont at the 2010 San Diego Comic-Con.

Another new X-book released at the time was X-Force, featuring the characters from The New Mutants, led by Cable; it was written by Rob Liefeld and Fabian Nicieza. Internal friction soon split the X-books' creative teams. In a controversial move, X-Men editor Bob Harras sided with Lee (and Uncanny X-Men artist Whilce Portacio) over Claremont in a dispute over plotting. Claremont left after only three issues of X-Men, ending his 16-year run as X-Men writer. Marvel replaced Claremont briefly with John Byrne, who scripted both books for a few issues. Byrne was then replaced by Nicieza and Scott Lobdell, who would take over the majority of writing duties for the X-Men until Lee's own departure months later when he and several other popular artists (including former X-title artists Liefeld, Portacio, and Marc Silvestri) would leave Marvel to form Image Comics. Jim Lee's X-Men designs would be the basis for much of the X-Men animated series and action figure line as well as several Capcom video games.

The 1990s saw an even greater number of X-books with numerous ongoing series and miniseries running concurrently. X-book crossovers continued to run annually, with "The X-Tinction Agenda" in 1990, "The Muir Island Saga" in 1991, "X-Cutioner's Song" in 1992, "Fatal Attractions" in 1993, "Phalanx Covenant" in 1994, "Legion Quest"/"Age of Apocalypse" in 1995, "Onslaught" in 1996, "Operation: Zero Tolerance" in 1997, "Hunt for Xavier" in 1998, "The Magneto War" in 1999, "Apocalypse: The Twelve" / "Ages of Apocalypse" in 2000 and "Eve of Destruction" in 2001. Though the frequent crossovers were criticized by fans as well as editorial and creative staff for being artificially regular, disruptive to the direction of the individual series, and having far less lasting impact than promised, they continued to be financially successful.

There were many additions to the X-Men in the 1990s, including Gambit, Cable, and Bishop. Gambit became one of the most popular X-Men, rivaling even Wolverine in size of fanbase after his debut in Uncanny X-Men #266 (Aug. 1990). Many of the later additions to the team came and went, such as Joseph, Maggott, Marrow, Cecilia Reyes, and a new Thunderbird. Xavier's New Mutants grew up and became X-Force, and the next generation of students began with Generation X, featuring Jubilee and other teenage mutants led and schooled by Banshee and ex-villainess Emma Frost at her Massachusetts Academy. In 1998, Excalibur and X-Factor ended and the latter was replaced with Mutant X, starring Havok stranded in a parallel universe. Marvel launched a number of solo series, including Deadpool, Cable, Bishop, X-Man, Gambit, Maverick, Rogue, Storm, Magneto, Beast, Domino, Warlock, Magik, Iceman and Sabretooth, but few of the series would survive the decade.

X-Men
 Uncanny X-Men, vol. 1 (flagship) – initially featured the Gold Team strike force led by Storm (1991–1995); later featured a team of X-Men recruited by Gladiator to defend the Shi'ar Empire against the Phalanx (1997); the Gold and Blue strike force merged to face new threats including Onslaught, Dark Beast, Shadow King and Magneto (1997–2000); later featured a squad led by Gambit during the Revolution revamp (2000–2001). The title is replaced by Astonishing X-Men during the Age of Apocalypse event.
 X-Men, vol. 2 – initially featured the Blue Team strike force led by Cyclops (1991–1995); later featured a new core group consisting of Cannonball, Cyclops, Jean Grey, Storm and Wolverine took on Sebastian Shaw and Bastion during the events of Operation: Zero Tolerance (1997); members of the Excalibur team joined the combined Gold and Blue strike force (1997–2000); later featured a squad led by Rogue during the Revolution revamp (2000–2001). The title is replaced by Amazing X-Men during the Age of Apocalypse event.
 X-Force, vol. 1 – Cable re-organized the New Mutants into the para-military mutant strike team (1991–1995); the team move in with the X-Men at the X-Mansion and effectively become the X-Men's junior team (1995–1997); the team later move to San Francisco to set up a new headquarter (1997–2001); the team becomes a covert ops superhero team under the leadership of Pete Wisdom during the Revolution revamp (2001). The title is replaced by Gambit & the X-Ternals during the Age of Apocalypse event.
 X-Men in Training
 Generation X, vol. 1 – students at the Massachusetts Academy mentored by Banshee and the former villain White Queen (1994–2001). The title is replaced by Generation Next during the Age of Apocalypse event. 
 Other Teams
 X-Factor, vol. 1 – the new team worked for the Pentagon replacing Freedom Force as the government-sponsored team (1991–1997); Forge later leads the mutant team as an underground government strike force (1997–1998). The title is replaced by Factor X during the Age of Apocalypse event.
 Excalibur, vol. 1 – the British team expanded and stays with Moira, making Muir Island their new base (1992–1998). The title is replaced by X-Calibre during the Age of Apocalypse event.
 Alpha Flight, vol. 2 – A new team formed by the reinstated Department H which is involved in clandestine and criminal activities.

Morrison Era 

In 2000, Claremont returned to Marvel and was put back on the primary X-Men titles during the Revolution revamp. He was later removed from the titles in 2001 and created his spin-off series, X-Treme X-Men. X-Men had its title changed to New X-Men and writer Grant Morrison took over. The book is often referred to as the Morrison-era, due to the drastic changes they made, beginning with "E Is For Extinction", where a new villain, Cassandra Nova, destroys Genosha, killing sixteen million mutants. Morrison also brought reformed ex-villain Emma Frost into the primary X-Men team, and opened the doors of the school by having Xavier "out" himself to the public about being a mutant. The bright spandex costumes that had become iconic over the previous decades were replaced by black leather street clothes reminiscent of the uniforms of the X-Men films. Morrison also introduced Xorn, who would figure prominently in the climax of his run. Ultimate X-Men set in Marvel's revised imprint was also launched, while Chuck Austen began his controversial run on Uncanny X-Men.

Several short-lived spin-offs and miniseries started featuring several X-Men in solo series, such as Emma Frost, Mystique, Cyclops, Iceman, Blink, Chamber, Mekanix (featuring Kitty Pryde), and Nightcrawler. Many of the second-tier X-books were relaunched with new titles: Cable became Soldier X and Deadpool became Agent X.

A new series titled X-Statix spawns from and replaces X-Force; it is a series that explores the crossroads between heroism and being a celebrity, and how being a mutant is only acceptable as a medium of disposable entertainment. It was known best for being a series that killed most of the introduced cast and having one of the highest team turnover rates for a superhero comic. The most prominent member to come out of X-Statix was Doop who is a green glob reminiscent of Slimer from Ghost Busters.

Another series, Exiles, started at the same time and concluded in December 2007 which led to New Exiles in January 2008 written by Claremont.

Notable additions to the X-Men have been Emma Frost, Danielle Moonstar, Husk and Northstar while former villain Juggernaut became member of the X-Men. Notable story arcs of this era are "E Is For Extinction" (2001), "Planet X" and "Here Comes Tomorrow".

 X-Men
 New X-Men, vol. 1 (flagship) – The X-Men took in dozens of students expanding the school from a training center to a legitimate school (2001–2004).
 Uncanny X-Men, vol. 1 – Nightcrawler and Angel co-lead the X-Men's primary field team to face new threat (2001–2004).
 X-Treme X-Men, vol. 1 – Storm formed a globe-trotting team to hunt down missing copies of the Destiny's Diaries (2001–2004).
 X-Men in Training
 New Mutants, vol. 2 – features a new group of teenage mutants attending the Xavier Institute.
 Other Teams
 Exiles, vol. 1 – a revolving team roster from different realities, which have been removed from time and space, employed by the Timebroker to fix broken realities.
 X-Statix – featured a group of young mutants marketed to be media superstars.
 NYX – featured a group of teenage mutants as they attempt to survive on the streets of New York City.
 Weapon X, vol. 2 – featured The Underground, a group assembled by Cable to oppose the activities of the third installment of the Weapon X Project.

X-Men ReLoad 

X-Men ReLoad was the name given by Marvel Comics to their May 2004 revamp of the X-Men titles, including new visual designs for the characters. The revamp was prompted by Grant Morrison's departure from New X-Men. As a result of the revamp, Chris Claremont moved from writing X-Treme X-Men to writing Uncanny X-Men, with Alan Davis doing the art. Chuck Austen moved from writing Uncanny X-Men to New X-Men, which returned to its old name of simply X-Men, with Salvador Larroca, who had been working with him on Uncanny X-Men doing the art. Finally, Joss Whedon entered as the writer of the new title Astonishing X-Men, with John Cassaday as artist. X-Treme X-Men was cancelled. X-Statix ended in October 2004. Also, the X-Men returned to more traditional (if not slightly revised) costumes, as opposed to the black leather uniforms from the movies. New X-Men: Academy X was also launched focusing on the lives of the new young mutants at the institute. This period included the resurrections of Colossus and Psylocke, a new death for Jean Grey, who later returned temporarily in the X-Men: Phoenix - Endsong, as well as Emma Frost becoming the new headmistress of the institute. The institute, formerly run as a school (until the depowering of 98% of the mutant population), served as a safe haven to mutants who are still powered.

Several short-lived spin-offs and miniseries started featuring several X-Men in solo series, such as Nightcrawler, Jubilee, Madrox, X-23, Gambit and Rogue. Cable and Deadpools books were merged into one book, Cable & Deadpool.

Notable additions to the X-Men have been Armor, Pixie and Warpath, while former villains such as Lady Mastermind, Mystique, and Sabretooth became members of the X-Men. Notable story arcs of this decade are "Gifted" (2004), "House of M" (2005), "Deadly Genesis" (2005–2006), "Decimation" (2006) and "Endangered Species" (2007). The X-Men were also involved in the "Civil War" and "World War Hulk" storylines.

 X-Men
 Astonishing X-Men, vol. 3 (flagship) – Cyclops leads the team of X-Men and they start presenting themselves as superheroes again.
 Uncanny X-Men, vol. 1 – Storm and her team continued operating as officially sanctioned mutant law enforcers (2004–2006); post Deadly Genesis, it featured Xavier taking a team to space to hunt Vulcan when he seeks vengeance on the Shi'ar Empire (2006–2007); the team returned to Earth to fight a group of rogue Morlocks (2007).
 X-Men, vol. 2 – Havok led a new field team consisting of Polaris, Iceman, Rogue, Gambit, Wolverine and Juggernaut (2004–2006); later featured Rogue assembling a rapid response team featuring the most dangerous X-Men former villains (2006–2007).
 X-Men in Training
 New X-Men: Academy X – the school is rebuilt after Xorn's attack and Emma Frost and Cyclops are named headmasters, organizing the student body into different squad who train together.
 New X-Men, vol. 2 – After House of M and Decimation, Emma Frost disbanded all former training squads and integrated those students she deemed capable of combat to a new team.
 Other Teams
 Excalibur, vol. 3 – Professor X and Magneto formed a team to rebuild the devastated mutant nation of Genosha.
 X-Factor, vol. 3 – a mutant detective agency founded by Madrox based on Mutant Town.
 New Excalibur – After Decimation, Captain Britain brings together a new team of Excalibur as the British government decided to become more pro-active with metahuman affairs. 
 District X – Bishop is assigned to the Mutant Town to investigate rising crime rates.
 X-Force, vol. 2 – Cable re-assembles the team in order to stop an immortal creature called Skornn.
 Weapon X, vol. 2 – featured Wolverine, Fantomex and Agent Zero quest to find the recently revived John Sublime.
 Exiles, vol. 1 – the team learned the true nature of the Timebroker and later traveled through different realities to chase Proteus.
 Alpha Flight, vol. 3 – Sasquatch recruits novice Canadian heroes to rescue the members kidnapped by the Plodex.

 Messiah Trilogy 
In 2007, the "Messiah Complex" storyline saw the destruction of the Xavier Institute and the disbanding of the X-Men. It spun the new volumes of X-Force, following the team led by Wolverine, and Cable, following Cable's attempts at protecting Hope Summers. X-Men was renamed into X-Men: Legacy which focused on Professor X, Rogue and Gambit. Under Cyclops's leadership, the X-Men later reformed in Uncanny X-Men #500, with their new base located in San Francisco.

In 2009, "Messiah War," written by Craig Kyle and Chris Yost to serve as the second part in the trilogy that began with "Messiah Complex," was released. Utopia, written by Matt Fraction, was a crossover of Dark Avengers and Uncanny X-Men that served as a part of the "Dark Reign" storyline. A new New Mutants volume written by Zeb Wells, which featured the more prominent members of the original team reunited, was launched. Magneto joined the X-Men during the Nation X storyline to the dismay of other members of the X-Men, such as Beast, who left the team. Magneto began to work with Namor to transform Utopia into a homeland for both mutants and Atlanteans. After the conclusion of Utopia, Rogue became the main character of X-Men: Legacy.
In 2010, "Second Coming" concluded the plot threads on Messiah Complex and Messiah War.

Several short-lived miniseries started featuring several X-Men in solo series, such as Daken, Cable, Psylocke, Namor: The First Mutant and X-23.

Notable additions to the X-Men have been Pixie, Karma, Sunspot, Magma, Magik, Namor, Domino, Boom Boom, Fantomex and X-23. Other notable story arcs of this era are "Divided We Stand" (2008), "Manifest Destiny" (2008–2009), "X-Infernus", "Utopia" (2009), "Nation X" (2009–2010), "Necrosha" (2009), "Curse of the Mutants" (2010–2011), and "Age of X" (2011). The X-Men were also involved in the "Secret Invasion", "War of Kings", "Siege", "Chaos War" and "Fear Itself" storylines.

 X-Men
 Uncanny X-Men, vol. 1 (flagship) – The X-Men open their new base in San Francisco and invite the world's mutant to join them (2008–2009); Cyclops later decided to move the mutant population to Utopia and off U.S. soil to avoid further persecution by the government (2009–2011).
 X-Men Legacy, vol. 1 – featured Professor X's road to recovery as well as the encounters he faced during Messiah CompleX (2008–2009); later featured Rogue as mentor to the younger mutants under the protection of the X-Men on Utopia (2009–2011).
 New Mutants, vol. 3 – the original team is reunited to form a new field team for the X-Men.
 Astonishing X-Men, vol. 3 – the X-Men serve as protectors of San Francisco City.
 X-Men, vol. 3 – featured team-ups between characters of X-Men and other superheroes such as Blade, Spider-Man, Ghost Rider and the Future Foundation.
 X-Men in Training
 Young X-Men – a group of young mutants tricked by Donald Pierce disguised as Cyclops.
 Generation Hope – Hope leads a new team, consisting of five new mutants ("five lights") that appeared on Cerebro after she manifested her powers.
 Other Teams
 X-Force, vol. 3 – Wolverine leads a more militaristic black-ops branch of the X-Men.
 X-Factor, vol. 3 – the agency briefly moved to Detroit, Michigan and expanded to include several new partners.
 Dark X-Men – Norman Osborn formed his own group of X-Men during the riots at San Francisco.
 Alpha Flight, vol. 4 – the team provides rescue efforts for the victims during the events of Fear Itself.
 Exiles, vol. 2 – a new team of heroes are brought together by Morph, acting as the new Timebroker.

 "Schism" through "Regenesis" 

In 2011, the aftermath of the "X-Men: Schism" storyline led to the fallout between Wolverine and Cyclops. During the "Regenesis" storyline, Wolverine's team was featured in a new flagship series titled Wolverine and the X-Men, Wolverine rebuilt the original X-Mansion and named it the Jean Grey School for Higher Learning. Meanwhile, Uncanny X-Men relaunched for the first time ever and served as the flagship title for Cyclops' Team. In 2012 "Avengers vs. X-Men" served as a closure to the "House of M" and "Decimation" storylines. It featured the death of Professor X and the reappearance of new mutants after the return of the Phoenix Force.

Several short-lived miniseries started featuring several X-Men in solo series, such as Storm, Gambit and Magneto: Not a Hero (featuring Magneto and Joseph).

Notable additions to the X-Men have been Warbird and Blink. The "Avengers vs. X-Men" storyline also took place during this period.

 Cyclops' X-Men
Uncanny X-Men, vol. 2 – the flagship of the Cyclops' team with the Extinction Team dealing with potential threats to mutantkind's survival.
X-Men, vol. 3 – Storm's field team operating from an aeroplane to neutralize threats before reaching crisis levels.
New Mutants, vol. 3 – Cyclops tasked the New Mutants as a clean-up team to resolve loose ends.
Generation Hope – a rapid response team locating new lights as they manifested with Rogue and later Shadowcat serving as liaison
 Wolverine's X-Men
 Wolverine and the X-Men, vol. 1 – the flagship of the Wolverine's team featuring the faculty and student of the Jean Grey School for Higher Learning.
 X-Men Legacy, vol. 1 – Rogue leads a team acting as the school's security detail
 Astonishing X-Men, vol. 3 – Wolverine's field team forming after the attack of the Marauders.
 X-Men in Training
 Wolverine and the X-Men (also served as the flagship title)
 Other Teams
 Uncanny X-Force, vol. 1 – a black ops team led by Wolverine with members from the previous strike force.
 X-Factor, vol. 3 – Havok stepped back in to co-lead with Polaris after the disappearance of Madrox.
 X-Treme X-Men, vol. 2 – a group of heroes from alternate dimensions led by Dazzler to defeat the Ten Evil Xaviers.
 X-Club – the X-Men's Science Team dealing with the mutant birth crisis and the effects of M-Day.
 Age of Apocalypse – featured the X-Terminated, human resistance fighters banded together to save the human race by taking out Weapon X and his new mutant regime.

Time Displaced Original X-Men

In 2012, as part of the Marvel NOW! relaunch, all X-Men titles (except Astonishing X-Men & Wolverine and the X-Men) were canceled, including Uncanny X-Men, X-Men: Legacy, X-Men and New Mutants. New flagship title All-New X-Men was launched which featured the original five X-Men members who were brought to the present day by Beast and were made a separate team led eventually by Kitty. The relaunched Uncanny X-Men featured Cyclops, his team and the new mutants, taking up residency in the Weapon X facility, which they have rebuilt into a school — the New Charles Xavier School for Mutants. An all female book titled simply X-Men was also launched. During All-New Marvel Now!, Astonishing X-Men was cancelled and in its place another flagship title Amazing X-Men was launched which featured the return of Nightcrawler and became the flagship title of Wolverine's team. Also, Wolverine and the X-Men was relaunched and turned into mutants-in-training book. In 2013, for the 50th anniversary of the X-Men, "Battle of the Atom" was published which involved members of both X-Men schools trying to decide what to do about the time-displaced original X-Men, culminating in a confrontation with a version of the Brotherhood and the X-Men from an unspecified future date. In 2014, Wolverine was killed off in the "Death of Wolverine" story arc, as the conclusion of a storyline that saw him lose his healing factor after he was infected by an intelligent virus.

Several short-lived miniseries started featuring several X-Men in solo series, such as X-Men Legacy (featuring Legion), Cyclops, Magneto, Nightcrawler, Storm and All-New Doop.

Notable additions to the X-Men have been Firestar and M. Notable story arcs of this era are "Battle of the Atom" (2013), "X-Termination" (2013), "Death of Wolverine" (2014), "AXIS" (2014) and "The Black Vortex" (2015).

 Cyclops' X-Men
All-New X-Men, vol. 1 – the flagship of the X-titles with the original X-Men brought from the past to the present to confront their future counterparts.
Uncanny X-Men, vol. 3 – the flagship of the Cyclops' team with Cyclops and the remnants of his Extinction team taking up a revolutionary course to promote mutant rights.
 Wolverine's X-Men
Amazing X-Men, vol. 2 – the flagship of the Wolverine's team featuring a field team with initial mission to search for the deceased Nightcrawler.
X-Men, vol. 4 – an all-female team dealing with new threats from Arkea and a new Sisterhood.
 X-Men in Training
Wolverine and the X-Men, vol. 2 – the summer term on the Jean Grey School that focused on Logan's legacy on his students Quentin Quire, Evan Sabahnur and Idie Okonkwo.
Spider-Man and the X-Men – Spider-Man leads a Special Class to investigate the students as requested by Wolverine before his demise.
 Other Teams
Cable and X-Force – a fugitive team led by Cable to face the threats that he saw in his visions.
Uncanny X-Force, vol. 2 – a proactive team of misfit X-Men led by Psylocke.
All-New X-Factor – a corporate-sponsored X-Factor team hired by Serval Industries.
X-Force, vol. 4 – the remnants of Cable's X-Force and Psylocke's X-Force merge to form a superhuman black ops.
Wolverines – a group of mutants with healing factor are captured by the Paradise escapees to help them find the adamantium-petrified body of Wolverine.

Terrigen Cloud

In 2015, as part of "All-New, All-Different Marvel", three team books were launched: the second volume of All-New X-Men, the fourth volume of Uncanny X-Men and Extraordinary X-Men. X-23 took on the mantle of Wolverine and got a new solo series and Old Man Logan also received a new ongoing series when the character found himself in (from his perspective) an alternate past. During this period, the mutants dealt with the threat of the Terrigen cloud that circulated the world and appeared to be toxic to them, placing the X-Men at odds with the Inhumans. The X-Men also dealt with Apocalypse resurfacing, and the truth of what happened between Cyclops and the Inhumans that led to his death. Storm's team resided in Limbo and worked to bring mutants to safety away from the Terrigen. Magneto's team took on a more militant approach. Beast worked alongside the Inhumans to attempt to find a way to alter the state of the Terrigen, but later discovered that it couldn't be altered and would have rendered Earth toxic for mutants. This revelation caused the X-Men to declare war against the Inhumans, but this conflict ended when the Inhumans learned what was happening, with Medusa sacrificing the Terrigen cloud to save the mutants.

Notable additions to the X-Men have been Old Man Logan and Cerebra. Notable story arcs of this era are "Apocalypse Wars" (2016), "Death of X" (2016) and "Inhumans vs. X-Men" (2016-2017). The X-Men were also involved in the "Civil War II" and "Monsters Unleashed" storylines.

 X-Men
Extraordinary X-Men – the flagship of the X-titles with X-Men relocated to Limbo following the release of the Terrigen Mists.
 Uncanny X-Men, vol. 4 – Magneto leads a team of deadly mutants to deal with threats to mutantkind.
 All-New X-Men, vol. 2 – the time-dispaced original X-Men embarking on a roadtrip in an attempt to live normal lives.

 ResurrXion 

In 2017, the ResurrXion lineup was launched with X-Men: Prime. It introduced new titles; X-Men Blue, X-Men Gold, Weapon X, new volumes of Astonishing X-Men and Generation X, new solo series for Cable, Jean Grey, and Iceman, and continuation of the Old Man Logan and All-New Wolverine run. With the Terrigen gone, the X-Men vacated Limbo and moved to Central Park where they returned to their heroic roots instead of constantly living in fear for their survival. Other notable changes include Kitty Pryde as the new leader of the X-Men, the time-displaced X-Men working with Magneto, Old Man Logan turning Weapon X into a black ops team, and mutant characters crossing over from Earth-1610 to the Earth-616 universe. Early 2018 saw the Phoenix Force returning to earth and mysteriously resurrecting the original Jean Grey. A new series featuring the original Jean leading a team of X-Men called X-Men Red was released later that same month. Rogue and Gambit's relationship became a focal point during the Rogue & Gambit miniseries and again in the Till Death Do Us Part story arc in X-Men Gold, which saw the two finally tie the knot, and once more during the Mr. & Mrs. X miniseries, which saw the new couple attempt to take their honeymoon but end up involved in an intergalactic conspiracy. Other noteworthy plot points included Wolverine's return coinciding with the arrival of a mysterious new villain named Persephone, Psylocke's return to her original body, Magneto's steady return to villainy, and the time-displaced X-Men facing the consequences of their presence in the 616 timeline, and the return of Cyclops. 2019 saw a new volume of Uncanny X-Men released beginning with a 10-part weekly story arc. Several solo series were launched, including Legion, Multiple Man, Domino, Shatterstar and X-23, before the revamp of the entire X-Men lineup.

Mainly Charles Xavier, Cyclops, Wolverine and Jean were resurrected and time displaced X-Men returned to their original timeline during the Extermination event.

Notable additions to the X-Men have been Pyro, Gentle, Scout, Trinary, Wolfsbane and Multiple Man. Notable story arcs of this decade are "Weapons of Mutant Destruction" (2017), "Phoenix Resurrection: The Return of Jean Grey" (2017–2018), "Poison X" (2018), "Extermination" (2018), "Hunt for Wolverine" (2018), "Return of Wolverine" (2018–2019), "X-Men: Disassembled" (2018–2019) and "Age of X-Man" (2019). The X-Men were also involved in the "Venomized", "Secret Empire" and "War of the Realms" storylines.

 X-Men
X-Men Gold – the flagship of the X-titles with Kitty Pryde leading the X-Men at the new location at Central Park; an ad hoc team is led by Iceman while Kitty Pryde and her team are in prison.
X-Men Blue – the time-displaced original X-Men mentored by Magneto; an ad hoc team is led by Polaris while the Original Five is lost in space.
 X-Men Red, vol. 1 – the resurrected Jean Grey leading a team to have the mutants recognized as a nation.
 Astonishing X-Men, vol 4 – an ad hoc team of X-Men members reunited in London to fight the Shadow King; later featured a ragtag team of X-Men co-led by Havok and Beast against the threat of the Reavers.
 Uncanny X-Men, vol. 5 – Jean Grey leads the remnants of the Gold and Red team after Nate Grey resurfaces proclaiming himself the mutant messiah and reshaping the world in his own view; Cyclops and Wolverine reformed the team following the dissolution of the X-Men after fighting X-Man.
 X-Men in Training
Generation X, vol. 2 – Jubilee's group of students at the rechristened Xavier Institute.
 Other Teams
Weapon X, vol. 3 – a black ops team of heroes and villains working together to take down a new Weapon X program.
New Mutants: Dead Soul – a team of former New Mutants and X-Factor members founded by Karma to investigate paranormal occurring.
X-Force, vol. 5 – original X-Force members Domino, Shatterstar, Cannonball, and Warpath are on the hunt for Kid Cable.
Exiles, vol. 3 – The Unseen recruits champions from alternate universes to save the multiverse from the Time Eaters.

 Krakoan Age of X-Men 

On May 14, 2019, Marvel announced they will cancel all the X-Men titles and relaunch the entire lineup. Jonathan Hickman will have full creative control and will start with two rotating bi-weekly six-issue limited series called House of X and Powers of X. After the 12 issues are released, Hickman will pen the flagship title and several new and traditional titles will be released. It was subsequently announced in July 2019 at San Diego Comic-Con that there would be six new X-titles as part of Marvel's Dawn of X campaign. Following the end of the X of Swords crossover, the sequel relaunch Reign of X will encompass a new era in the X-titles. Destiny of X featured the Second Krakoan Age of X-Men after the events of Inferno and X Lives of Wolverine/X Deaths of Wolverine.

Notable addition to the X-Men has been Synch. Notable story arcs of this era are "X of Swords" (2020), "Hellfire Gala" (2021), "Trial of Magneto" (2021), "Inferno" (2021), "X Lives of Wolverine/X Deaths of Wolverine" (2022), "Judgment Day" (2022), "Dark Web" (2022–2023), "Sins of Sinister" (2023) and "Weapons of Vengeance" (2023). The X-Men were also involved in the "Empyre", "King in Black" and "Devil's Reign" storylines.

 Dawn of X X-Men, vol. 5 – the flagship of the X-titles featuring world-building stories of the mutant renaissance featuring an overlapping cast members. Some of the stories include the introduction of Apocalypse's grandson, Summoner, leading in to the X of Swords crossover; a new villain group called Hordeculture, featured later in the Empyre tie-in; Professor X, Magneto and Apocalypse attending the World Economic Forum; Mystique's side mission during the attack on Orchis in House of X and the follow up mission to destroy Nimrod, leading into the Inferno storyline;X-Men (vol. 5) #20 the mutant rite Crucible, which is followed up in Way of X; an ad hoc team of Wolverine, Synch and Darwin assault of the Vault;X-Men (vol. 5) #18–19 the King Egg of the Brood race, a follow-up on a story started in the New Mutants; a tie-in to the Empyre event featuring Vulcan, and Magneto and the rest of the mutant nation fighting the Cotati; Cyclops, Marvel Girl and Storm helping with the kidnapping of Xandra, Majestrix of the Shi'ar Empire; and the X-Men election following its disbandbment upon the formation of the Krakoan government.X-Men (vol. 5) #21
 Marauders, vol. 1 – a rebranding of the supervillain team featuring Kitty Pryde (as Captain Kate Pryde), Storm, Iceman, Bishop, Pyro and Emma Frost as pirates who travel the world via ship controlling the supply and trade of the Krakoan drugs and protecting mutantkind by smuggling of mutants into and out of nations hostile to Krakoa.
 Excalibur, vol. 4 – a title starring Betsy Braddock, who takes over the mantle of Captain Britain from her brother Brian Braddock, alongside Rogue, Gambit, Jubilee, Rictor and Apocalypse.
 New Mutants, vol. 4 – spacefaring team led by Magik with a roster including Sunspot, Wolfsbane, Mirage, Karma, Cypher, Mondo and Chamber, and co-starring the Starjammers. A second team consists of Armor, Boom-Boom Glob, Maxime and Manon as an outreach party seeking young mutants who have chosen not to come to Krakoa. The New Mutants alumni started training young mutants in Krakoa amidst the threat of the Shadow King during the Reign of X relaunch. Magik gave up Limbo to Madelyne Pryor during the first arc of the Destiny of X relaunch. 
 Fallen Angels, vol. 2 – a revival of the 1987 title, this incarnation stars Kwannon (as Psylocke) who recruits Cable and X-23 for a personal mission which could jeapordize all of mutantkind.
 X-Force, vol. 6 – the mutant black-ops team which will consist of Beast, Jean Grey, Sage, Domino, Wolverine, Colossus and Kid Omega dealing with the threat of XENO and Mikhail Rasputin. During the Destiny of X relaunch, the team faced off Cerebrax (a sentient Cerebro unit) and added Deadpool and Omega Red to their roster.
 Wolverine, vol. 7 – featuring the titular mutant of the same name dealing with the Flower Cartel, the Vampire Nation and the Arakki mutant Solem. Wolverine teamed up with Deadpool during the Destiny of X relaunch.
 Hellions – a team of mutant troublemakers given an outlet for their gene-given desires with initial cast consisting of Empath, Havok, Mister Sinister, Nanny, Orphan-Maker, Psylocke, Scalphunter, and Wild Child.
 Cable, vol. 4 – featuring the younger version of the titular character dealing with the abduction of mutant children and the return of Stryfe.
 X-Factor, vol. 4 – a team investigating when a mutant dies and how to keep the rules of reincarnation which will consist of Polaris, Prestige, Northstar, Daken, Eye-Boy and Prodigy.Reign of XS.W.O.R.D., vol. 2 – the mutant nation's forefront representatives to the outer universe which consists of Abigail Brand, Magneto, Kid Cable, Frenzy, Manifold, Wiz Kid and Fabian Cortez.
Children of the Atom – a group of young vigilantes operating in New York City posing as mutants.
Way of X – featuring a team Nightcrawler assembled focused on the path of answers for mutantkind's spirituality. The title is concluded in the one-shot X-Men: The Onslaught Revelation.
X-Corp – a team headed by CXOs Warren and Monet staffed with some of the brightest and most deviant minds in mutantkind. 
X-Men, vol. 6 – a new team of chosen champions of mutantkind formed after the team's disbandbment upon the formation of the mutant homeland. The initial roster of Cyclops, Marvel Girl, Polaris, Wolverine, Rogue, Sunfire and Synch officially debut during the first Hellfire Gala. Cyclops, Marvel Girl, Synch, Magik, Havok, Iceman, Forge and Firestar are elected into the new team roster during the second Hellfire Gala.
X-Men Unlimited Infinity Comic – a Marvel Unlimited exclusive series featuring a rotating adventures of the Krakoan mutants. Story arcs included Wolverine against A.I.M in "Latitude" and "Longitude", Nature Girl's vendetta against humanity in "X-Men: Green," Juggernaut and Deadpool against The Warden in "Paradise Lost," Madrox and Strong Guy's adventures in "Downtime," Maggott and his slugs' resurrection in "Eany Come Home," the attack of the mutant language in "Cypher in Cryptolect," and the secret mission of the mutants who lost the second election in "Secret X-Men."
Sabretooth, vol. 4 – featuring the titular mutant dealing with his time at The Pit and other prisoners sent in the hole.
Secret X-Men – a one-shot title featuring a team of mutants who lost the first election on a secret mission to save the Shi'ar empire.Destiny of XImmortal X-Men – one of the flagship series starring the Quiet Council of Krakoa with Magneto leaving the Krakoan leadership. During the Sins of Sinister event, the title is replaced by Immoral X-Men.
Marauders, vol. 2 – Captain Pryde leads a new crew (Psylocke, Bishop, Daken, Somnus, Aurora, Tempo and Cassandra Nova) for rescuing mutants.
Knights of X – Captain Britain leads a team of ten knights (Rictor, Shatterstar, Gambit, Rachel Summers, Bei the Blood Moon, Gloriana, Kylun, Shogo, Mordred) into Otherworld in a quest to search the Siege Perilous.
Legion of X – the mutant police force formed by Nightcrawler and Legion including Juggernaut, Pixie, Blindfold and Doctor Nemesis. During the Sins of Sinister event, the title is replaced by Nightcrawlers featuring Sinister's private army of chimera assassins.
X-Men Red, vol. 2 – a title featuring the Planet Arakko under the guidance of the conflicting factions of Storm's Brotherhood and Brand's X-Men Red. During the Sins of Sinister event, the title is replaced by Storm & the Brotherhood of Mutants.
X-Terminators, vol. 2 – a limited series featuring Wolverine, Dazzler, Jubilee and Boom-Boom battling armies of vampires.
Deadpool, vol. 9 – featuring the titular mutate as he auditions for the elite group known as the Atelier.
Sabretooth & the Exiles – featuring the mutants exiled in The Pit (Nekra, Oya, Madison Jeffries, Melter, Third Eye, Nanny, Orphan-Maker, Toad) in pursuit of an escaped Sabretooth.
Bishop: War College – a limited series featuring Bishop training young mutants (Armor, Surge, Cam Long, Aura Charles, and Amass) as War Captains in training for Krakoa.
Betsy Braddock: Captain Britain – a title featuring Captain Britain's new mission after the Otherworld is restored in Knights of X.
Rogue & Gambit – a limited series featuring the couple's next adventure after the departure from their previous teams.
New Mutants: Lethal Legion – a limited series featuring the resident New Mutants battle against Count Nefaria's Lethal Legion.Other Titles:X-Men/Fantastic Four – a limited series focusing on Franklin Richards of the Fantastic Four being offered to join the X-Men nation of Krakoa.
Giant-Size X-Men – a series of one-shots focusing on different X-Men members. Jean Grey, Emma Frost, Magneto, Nightcrawler, Fantomex, Storm and Thunderbird are featured in the series.
Empyre: X-Men –  tie-in to the event Empyre featuring a team of mutants fighting against the Cotati and the Genoshan zombies.
Juggernaut, vol. 3 – featuring the titular character of the same name dealing with his quest for Cyttorak and working for Damage Control.
X-Men: Curse of the Man-Thing – Magik and her team of monster mutants, the Dark Riders, help with the threat of the Man-Thing.
Cable: Reloaded – tie-in to The Last Annihilation crossover featuring Cable and the All-New X-Terminators helping the Guardians of the Galaxy defeat Dormammu.
The Death of Doctor Strange: X-Men/Black Knight – tie-in to the Death of Doctor Strange event featuring Black Knight and Excalibur protecting London from the demonic X-Men.
Devil's Reign: X-Men – tie-in to the Devil's Reign event featuring Emma Frost and her time working for the Kingpin.
X-Men and Moon Girl – the X-Men assist Moon Girl in her fight against the High Evolutionary to save Devil Dinosaur.
Ms. Marvel and Wolverine – Wolverine teams up with Ms. Marvel when a mysterious threat lands in New York City compromising Krakoan tech/security.

Team roster

The X-Men team lineup has varied throughout the years and splintered into several other newer teams.

The original team lineup introduced Cyclops, Jean Grey, Beast, Angel, and Iceman as well as Professor X.

Later issues brought fan favorites and frequent members Wolverine, Storm, Colossus, Nightcrawler, Rogue, Kitty Pryde, Jubilee, Domino,  Gambit, Emma Frost, Psylocke, Havok, Dazzler, Polaris, Bishop, Forge and Banshee, among others.

Enemies

The X-Men have a gallery of enemies they regularly face, the most common of which being Professor X’s friend-turned-enemy Magneto.

Other foes include Mystique, Emma Frost, Apocalypse, Mister Sinister, the mutant-hunting robot Sentinels, villain teams such as the Brotherhood of Evil Mutants and the Hellfire Club, and racism and discrimination from the human race.

Themes and motifs
The X-Men use many recurring plot-devices and motifs for their various story arcs over the years that have become commonplace within the X-Men canon.

Reflecting social issues
The conflict between mutants and normal humans is often compared to real-world conflicts experienced by minority groups in America such as African Americans, various religious or non-religious groups, (Muslims, those with autism, the LGBTQ community, etc.) It has been remarked that attitudes towards mutants do not make sense in the context of the Marvel Universe, since non-mutants with similar powers are rarely regarded with fear; X-Men editor Ann Nocenti remarked that "I think that's literary, really - because there is no difference between Colossus and the Torch. If a guy comes into my office in flames, or a guy comes into my office and turns to steel, I'm going to have the same reaction. It doesn't really matter that I know their origins. ... as a book, The X-Men has always represented something different - their powers arrive at puberty, making them analogous to the changes you go through at adolescence - whether they're special, or out of control, or setting you apart - the misfit identity theme." Also on an individual level, a number of X-Men serve a metaphorical function as their powers illustrate points about the nature of the outsider.

 Racism: Although this was not initially the case, Professor X has come to be compared to civil rights movement leader Martin Luther King Jr. and Magneto to the more militant Malcolm X. (Magneto, in the first film, quotes Malcolm X with the line "By any means necessary.") X-Men comic books have often portrayed mutants as victims of mob violence, evoking images of the lynching of African Americans in the age before the civil rights movement. Sentinels and anti-mutant hate groups such as Friends of Humanity, Humanity's Last Stand, the Church of Humanity, and Stryker's Purifiers are thought to often represent oppressive forces like the Ku Klux Klan giving a form to denial of civil rights and amendments.

1980s storylines involving the fictional island nation of Genosha, where mutants are segregated and enslaved by an apartheid state, are widely interpreted as a reference to the contemporary situation of apartheid in South Africa. Chamber (2002) explicitly cites the Norman Rockwell painting The Problem We All Live With. The miniseries portrays using the mutant context affirmative action, National Guard troops escorting a new student, sympathetic and antagonistic majority members, and majority-supremacist terrorism. Some mutants avoid confrontation and seek integration, while more militant mutants play the race card, reject their human-given names, and denounce those who do not as Stepin Fetchit and Uncle Tom.
 Antisemitism: Explicitly referenced in recent decades is the comparison between antimutant sentiment and antisemitism. Magneto, a Holocaust survivor, sees the situation of mutants as similar to those of Jews in Nazi Germany. At one point he even utters the words "never again" in a 1992 episode of the X-Men animated series. The mutant slave labor camps on the island of Genosha, in which numbers were burned into mutant's foreheads, show much in common with Nazi concentration camps, as do the internment camps of the classic "Days of Future Past" storyline. In the third X-Men film, when asked by Callisto: "If you're so proud of being a mutant, then where's your mark?" Magneto shows his concentration camp tattoo, while mentioning that he will never let another needle touch his skin. In the prequel film X-Men: First Class, a fourteen-year-old Magneto suffers Nazi human experimentation during his time in the camps and witnesses his mother's death by gunshot.
 Diversity: Characters within the X-Men mythos hail from a wide variety of nationalities. These characters also reflect religious, ethnic or sexual minorities. Examples include Kitty Pryde/Shadowcat, Magneto and Sabra who are of Jewish descent. Dust and M who are Muslim, Nightcrawler who is a devout Catholic. Neal Shaara/Thunderbird who is Hindu. Jubilee is Chinese American, Gambit is born to Cajun parents from New Orleans, Louisiana and Rogue is from Caledecott County, Mississippi both of whom are Southerners. Warpath along with his deceased brother the first Thunderbird are Native Americans of Apache descent. Storm represents two aspects of the African diaspora as her father was African American and her mother was Kenyan. Karma was portrayed as a devout Catholic from Vietnam, who regularly attended Mass and confession when she was introduced as a founding member of the New Mutants. This team also included Wolfsbane (a devout Scottish Presbyterian), Danielle Moonstar (a Native American of Cheyenne descent), Cannonball, and was later joined by Magma (a devout Greco-Roman classical religionist). Different nationalities included Wolverine, Aurora, Northstar, Deadpool and Transonic from Canada; Colossus and Magik from Russia; Banshee and Siryn from Ireland; Dust from Afghanistan; Psylocke, Wolfsbane and Chamber from the United Kingdom; Sunfire, Armor, Surge and Zero from Japan; Sunspot from Brazil; M from Monaco; Nightcrawler from Germany; Sabra from Israel; Omega Sentinel, Neal Shaara, Kavita Rao and Indra from India; Velocidad from Mexico; Oya from Nigeria; Primal from Ukraine; etc.
 LGBT themes: Some commentators have noted the similarities between the struggles of mutants and the LGBT community, noting the onset of special powers around puberty and the parallels between being closeted and the mutants' concealment of their powers. In the comics series, gay and bisexual characters include Anole, Bling!, Destiny, Karma, Mystique, Psylocke, Courier, Northstar (whose marriage was depicted in the comics in 2012), Graymalkin, Rictor, Shatterstar, Shade, the Ultimate version of Colossus and later Iceman after revealing that he is a mutant; the comics version of the character was then revealed to be gay in 2015. Transgender issues also come up with shapechangers like Mystique, Copycat, and Courier who can change gender at will. It has been said that the comic books and the X-Men animated series delved into the AIDS epidemic with a long-running plot line about the Legacy Virus, a seemingly incurable disease thought at first to attack only mutants (similar to the AIDS virus which at first was spread through the gay community). In the film X-Men: First Class, Hank McCoy is asked by his CIA boss why he never disclosed his mutant identity, and his response was "you didn't ask, I didn't tell".
 Communism and socialism: Occasionally, undercurrents of the real-life "Red Scare" are present or the events of the Red Scare in history are alluded to. Senator Robert Kelly's proposal of a Mutant Registration Act is similar to the efforts of United States Congress to try to ban communism in the United States. In the 2000 X-Men film, Kelly exclaims, "We must know who these mutants are and what they can do," even brandishing a "list" of known mutants (a reference to Senator Joseph McCarthy's list of Communist Party USA members who were working in the government).
 Religion: Religion is an integral part of several X-Men storylines. It is presented as both a positive and negative force, sometimes in the same story. The comics explore religious fundamentalism through the person of William Stryker and his Purifiers, an antimutant group that emerged in the 1982 graphic novel God Loves, Man Kills. The Purifiers believe that mutants are not human beings but children of the devil, and have attempted to exterminate them several times, most recently in the "Childhood's End" storyline. By contrast, religion is also central to the lives of several X-Men, such as Nightcrawler, a devout Catholic, and Dust, a devout Sunni Muslim who wears an Islamic niqāb.
 Subculture: In some cases, the mutants of the X-Men universe sought to create a subculture of the typical mutant society portrayed. The Morlocks, though mutants like those attending Xavier's school, hide away from society within the tunnels of New York. These Morlock tunnels serve as the backdrop for several X-Men stories, most notably The Mutant Massacre crossover. This band of mutants illustrates another dimension to the comic, that of a group that further needs to isolate itself because society won't accept it. In Grant Morrison's stories of the early 2000s, mutants are portrayed as a distinct subculture with "mutant bands," mutant use of code-names as their primary form of self-identity (rather than their given birth names), and a popular mutant fashion designer who created outfits tailored to mutant physiology. The series District X takes place in an area of New York City called "Mutant Town." These instances can also serve as analogies for the way that minority groups establish subcultures and neighborhoods of their own that distinguish them from the broader general culture. Director Bryan Singer has remarked that the X-Men franchise has served as a metaphor for acceptance of all people for their special and unique gifts. The mutant condition that is often kept secret from the world can be analogous to feelings of difference and fear usually developed in everyone during adolescence.
 Genocide''': Genocide and its psychological after-effects, primarily survivor guilt, are recurring elements in some of the most significant X-Men story arcs. Magneto was a survivor of The Holocaust and witnessed the genocide of his people, severely scarring him emotionally and leaving him with a strong distrust of humanity. Because of this he constantly toes the line between ally and enemy of the X-Men. The iconic Days of Future Past story line saw an alternate future where Sentinels committed genocide on most of the world's mutants. In Rachel Summers' original timeline, she was captured by humans and turned into a 'hound' used to hunt down other mutants in order to capture and kill them, leaving her extremely traumatized by the experience and knowledge that she unwittingly assisted in the genocide of her own people. Bishop's childhood consisted of him being trapped in a mutant concentration camp, leaving him so emotionally scarred as an adult that upon returning to the past he was prepared to kill a baby who might have caused his future. When Cassandra Nova committed genocide on Genosha, the event left both Emma Frost  and Polaris<ref>New X-Men'" #132</ref> traumatized by survivor's guilt as they were amongst the limited few survivors. While taking some time off in Germany, Nightcrawler witnessed the genocide of numerous mutants. The event left him as an emotional shell of who he used to be because of the trauma of what he witnessed until he had psychic therapy with Jean to help him cope. Other characters who have either committed or have survived genocide include Mystique, Callisto, Apocalypse, Onslaught, Bastion, Mister Sinister, Hope Summers, Cable, and the Phoenix Force.

Time travel
Many of the X-Men's stories delve into time travel either in the sense of the team traveling through time on a mission, villains traveling through time to alter history, or certain characters traveling from the past or future in order to join the present team. Story arcs and spin-offs that are notable for using this plot device include Days of Future Past, Messiah Complex, All-New X-Men, Messiah War, and Battle of the Atom. Characters who are related to time travel include: Apocalypse, Bishop, Cable, Old Man Logan, Prestige, Hope Summers, Tempus, and Stryfe. A major notable period in the X-Men's history began in 2012s All-New X-Men when Beast used time-travel to bring the original five 1960s X-Men into the present. These time-displaced characters subsequently starred in their own title X-Men Blue before returning to their original timeline in 2018s Extermination event.

Death and resurrection
One of the most recurring plot devices used in the X-Men franchise is death and resurrection, mostly in the sense of Jean Grey and her bond with the Phoenix. Though not as iconic as Jean and the Phoenix, many other X-Men characters have died and come back to life on occasion. Death and resurrection has become such a common occurrence in the X-books that the characters have mentioned on numerous occasions that they are not strangers to death or have made comments that death doesn't always have a lasting effect on them (for example, "In mutant heaven, there are no pearly gates, only revolving doors"). X-Necrosha is a particular story arc that sees Selene temporarily reanimate many of the X-Men's dead allies and enemies in order for her to achieve godhood. In the Krakoan era, the characters invent a method of resurrecting mutants who have died; becoming a significant story element across the various x-men books.

Fate
Many of the characters deal with the topic of fate. In particular, Destiny's abilities of precognition have affected certain plot points in the X-Men's history long after she was killed off due to both the X-Men and their enemies constantly searching for her missing diaries that foretell certain futures. The topic of fate takes center stage yet again in a story arc called "The Extremists" involving attacks against the Morlocks due to one of them seeing a dark future for their people. Some characters believe they already know their own fates, such as Apocalypse believing he is fated to rule the mutants or Magneto believing he is fated to lead the mutants to rise up against humans. Other characters such as Jean, Prestige, Evan Sabanur, Hope Summers, and Warren Worthington III have all been wary of their fates and have all taken measures to alter their futures.

Space travel
Space travel has been a common staple in the X-Men books beginning with the Phoenix and Dark Phoenix sagas. Since then space has been involved in many stories involving the X-Men's allies and occasional rivals the Shi'ar along with stories involving the Phoenix Force. Space has been the setting for many stories involving the likes of The Brood, such as the story arc where the villainous species was first introduced. Through space noteworthy characters like The Starjammers and Vulcan (lost brother of Cyclops and Havok) were introduced. Space Travel played a major role in Joss Whedon's run on Astonishing X-Men via the introduction of S.W.O.R.D. and especially in one of the final story arcs under his authorship called "Unstoppable". Other notable story arcs involving space included "X-Men: The End", "Rise and Fall of the Shi'ar Empire", "X-Men: Kingbreaker", "War of Kings", and "The Black Vortex".

Sanity
The topic of sanity has been addressed in many of the major heroes and villains of X-Men. Most famously this is addressed in Jean Grey when she gains near omnipotence through the Phoenix and Professor Xavier after he violently uses his powers against Magneto, unintentionally creating Onslaught. Mystique's sanity wavers throughout the franchise as her constant transformations causes more and more of her mind to fracture. Ever since swapping bodies with Revanche, Psylocke has occasionally struggled to maintain her sanity due to her more aggressive nature and new powers. The character Deadpool is famous for his blatant lack of sanity. After Magneto stripped Wolverine of his metal bones, Wolverine began to become increasingly feral throughout most of the mid to late 1990s X-Men comics. The nature of Rogue's powers affecting her sanity due to her retaining the memories of others has been a central plot device on many occasions, most famously retaining Ms. Marvel's psyche throughout most of the 1980s. Most recently Emma Frost's sanity has become fractured ever since Cyclops died in her arms, causing her to declare war against Inhumans. Other characters who have had issues with sanity include Cyclops, Sabretooth, Magik, Quentin Quire, X-23, and Prestige.

Political warfare
In the Marvel Universe, mutant rights is one of the hot controversial political topics and is something that is addressed numerous times in the X-books as a plot device. While some politicians like Valerie Cooper have legitimately tried to help the X-Men, most have made it their mission to discredit the X-Men in order to eliminate mutants once and for all. Senator Robert Kelly began his platform on a strong outspoken anti-mutant sentiment until he changed his mind after being rescued by mutants later on in his career. When Sabretooth's human son Graydon Creed ran for office, the X-Men sent in Cannonball and Iceman to discreetly join his campaign team and find anything on his anti-mutant agenda. This continued until it boiled to a head when his assassination led to "Operation: Zero Tolerance." Some of the issues presented in the comics serve as allegory to modern issues in the real world, such as Lydia Nance suggesting mass mutant deportation.

Ideological Difference
Characters in the X-Men franchise espouse a variety of political ideologies, and these differences are a frequent catalyst for conflict. The most prominent ideological clash in the X-Men franchise is that between Xavier and Magneto; despite later interpretations of the two as analogues for Martin Luther King Jr. and Malcolm X, writer Chris Claremont (who originated Magneto's backstory and history with Xavier) saw them as more comparable to David Ben-Gurion and Menachem Begin. Xavier's ideology has drawn comparisons to assimilationism and model minority politics, while Magneto, originally depicted as a mutant supremacist, is later portrayed as a liberationist advocating self-determination through mutually assured destruction. Callisto is a separatist, who seeks to protect the Morlocks through isolationism. Emma Frost is portrayed as rejecting social movements, opting to use the capitalist system for her personal benefit, or for that of individual mutants in her care. Apocalypse is characterized as a social darwinist who believes that mutants can only survive through the rule of might. The Mutant Liberation Front commits acts of terrorism to liberate mutants wrongly incarcerated by the government. Even when individual characters expressing conflicting ideologies are portrayed as either misguided or villainous, their motives and beliefs are often treated by the X-Men with nuance, sympathy, and respect; for example, during Secret Wars, when The Avengers take issue with Magneto's placement among the heroic team by The Beyonder, the X-Men defend him as an ally, despite disagreeing with his methods. Pulitzer-winning national security journalist Spencer Ackerman has stated that "the importance of the X-Men as a universe of stories, as a mythos, is that we should always be debating who is right."

Setting

The X-Men exist in the Marvel Universe along with other characters featured in Marvel Comics series and often interact with them. The X-Men/mutant corner of the Marvel Universe has been informally called "X-Universe". For instance, Wolverine was an antagonist to the Hulk before joining the X-Men and has ties to other heroes such as Captain America, Black Widow, the Thing, Captain Marvel (Carol Danvers), Elektra and Spider-Man. Quicksilver and Scarlet Witch are former Brotherhood of Mutants members who joined the Avengers, as have other X-Men characters such as Beast. Rogue got her powers via absorbing Carol Danvers (then called Ms. Marvel) who has also interacted with the X-Men. Kitty Pryde/Shadowcat has been part of the Guardians of the Galaxy and dated Star-Lord, she also served as a mentor to Franklin Richards the mutant son of Mister Fantastic and Invisible Woman of the Fantastic Four. Storm was once the Queen of Wakanda and the wife of Black Panther, as well as a temporary member of the Fantastic Four. Rachel Summers was the girlfriend of Franklin Richards. Iceman and Angel have also joined the original Champions alongside Black Widow, Ghost Rider and Hercules as well as having frequent partnerships with Firestar and Spider-Man as "The Amazing Friends". Sabretooth was an Iron Fist villain before becoming Wolverine's archenemesis. And both the X-Men and the Avengers formed a team called Uncanny Avengers (aka Avengers Unity Division) after a conflict over the Phoenix Force. The global nature of the mutant concept means the scale of stories can be highly varied. The X-Men's enemies range from mutant thieves to galactic threats.

Historically, the X-Men have been based in the Xavier Institute of Gifted Youngsters/X-Mansion located in Salem Center, Westchester County, New York, and are often portrayed as a family. The Xavier's School for Gifted Youngsters/X-Mansion is often depicted with three floors and two underground levels. To the outside world, it acted as a higher learning institute until the 2000s, when Xavier was publicly exposed as a mutant at which point it became a known mutant boarding school. Xavier funds a corporation aimed at reaching mutants worldwide, though it ceased to exist following the 2005 "Decimation" storyline. The X-Men benefit from advanced technology such as Xavier tracking down mutants with a device called Cerebro which amplifies his powers; the X-Men train within the Danger Room, first depicted as a room full of weapons and booby traps, now as generating holographic simulations; and the X-Men travel in their Blackbird jet.

Fictional places
The X-Men introduced several fictional locations which are regarded as important within the shared universe in which Marvel Comics characters exist:

 Asteroid M, an asteroid made by Magneto, a mutant utopia and training facility off of the Earth's surface.
 Avalon, Magneto's space station that served as the primary base for him and his Acolytes to create a mutants-only safe haven after Magneto drastically reverted to his villainous ways.
 Genosha, an island near Madagascar and a longtime apartheid regime against mutants. The U.N. gave control to Magneto until the E Is for Extinction story saw Genosha destroyed via mass genocide.
 Krakoa, a living island which is currently home to the X-Men and other mutants. It is an official country.
 Limbo, a hellish dimension heavily populated by demons. Whoever possesses the Soulsword bears control over and can draw power from Limbo. In Extraordinary X-Men, the X-Men made a sanctuary in Limbo called X-Haven their home after Terrigen started making earth uninhabitable for mutants.
 Madripoor, an island in South East Asia, near Singapore. Its location is shown to be in the southern portion of the Strait of Malacca, south west of Singapore.
 Mojoverse, an alternate dimension ruled by the tyrant Mojo focused on creating violent reality entertainment usually featuring captive mutants
 Murderworld, fictional twisted amusement park designed by the Marvel supervillain known as Arcade.
 Muir Island, a remote island off the coast of Scotland. This is primarily known in the X-Men universe as the home of Moira MacTaggert's laboratory.
 Mutant Town (also known as District X), an area in Alphabet City, Manhattan, populated largely by mutants and beset by poverty and crime.
 New Tien, a mutant-run region on the west coast of the United States where mutants outnumber humans. It was created after Hydra took over the United States. Emma Frost secretly leads New Tien by telepathically possessing New Tien's puppet ruler Xorn.
 Savage Land, a preserved location in Antarctica which is home to a number of extinct species, most notably dinosaurs, and strange tribes.
 Shi'ar throneworld Chandilar, the home world of the X-Men's occasional extraterrestrial allies The Shi'ar.
 Utopia, Cyclops had Asteroid M raised from the Pacific Ocean off the coast of the San Francisco as a response to the rise of anti-mutant sentiment to form a mutant nation.

Cultural impact and legacy

Accolades 

 In 2012, Complex ranked the X-Men 4th in their "10 Best Superhero Teams In Comics" list.
 In 2016, Screen Rant ranked the X-Men 3rd in their "15 Best Superhero Teams Of All Time" list.
 In 2018, Vanity Fair included the X-Men in their "Stan Lee’s Most Iconic Characters" list.
 In 2020, CBR.com ranked the X-Men 1st in their "Marvel: 10 Most Powerful Teams" list.
 In 2021, CBR.com ranked the X-Men 2nd in their "Every Marvel Superhero Team" list and 2nd in their "Marvel: The 10 Strongest Superhero Teams" list.
 In 2022, Newsarama ranked the X-Men 3rd in their "Best superhero teams of all time" list.
 In 2022, CBR.com ranked the X-Men 1st in their "10 Marvel Teams That Exceeded Expectations" list.

Impact 
The insecurity and anxieties in Marvel's early 1960s comic books such as The Fantastic Four, The Amazing Spider-Man, The Incredible Hulk, and X-Men ushered in a new type of superhero, very different from the certain and all-powerful superheroes before them, and changed the public's perception of superheroes. The superhero team has been described as an allegory to real-life struggles experienced by people rejected by society.

Other versions 
 Age of Apocalypse – In a world where Professor X is killed before he can form the X-Men, Magneto leads the X-Men in a dystopian world ruled by Apocalypse. Created and reverted via time travel.
 Age of X - a world in which anti-mutant sentiment became even worse due to a series of events and thus led to the United States government hunting down mutants with Sentinels and leading to "The Decimation" which severely reduced the mutant population and Magneto leads the mutants who are based in Fortress X.
 Days of Future Past – Sentinels have either killed or placed into concentration camps almost all mutants. Prevented by the time-traveling Kate Pryde/Widget (the adult Kitty Pryde/Shadowcat).
 House of M – Reality is altered by Scarlet Witch, with her father Magneto as the ruler of Genosha and in which mutants are the dominant group with humans as second-class citizens. 2005's crossover event, it concludes with a reversion to the normal Marvel Universe, albeit with most mutants depowered.
 Marvel 1602 – Mutants are known as the "Witchbreed" in this alternate reality set during the time of The Inquisition. Carlos Javier creates a "school for the children of gentlefolk" to serve as a safe haven and training ground.
 Marvel 2099 – Set in a dystopian world with new characters looking to the original X-Men as history, becoming X-Men 2099 and X-Nation 2099.
 Marvel Noir - The X-Men of this reality are a group of delinquent teenagers led by Charles Xavier who believes that sociopathy is the next step in human evolution.
 Mutant X – Set in a world where Scott Summers was captured along with his parents by the Shi'ar and only Alex escaped, allowing him to be the eventual leader of this Universe's X-Men ("The Six"). The Mutant X universe reimagines Mr. Fantastic, Nick Fury, and Professor X as villains and Doctor Doom and Apocalypse as heroes.
 MC2 - In this alternate future, Jubilee forms the X-People in response to anti-mutant sentiment. Members include Angry Eagle, Simian, Spanner, Torque, Push, Bluestreak, J2, and Wild Thing.
  Time-displaced X-Men - The time-displaced team was introduced as such in All-New X-Men vol. 1 #1, by Brian Michael Bendis and Stuart Immonen, and brought to the present with time travel. They were kept as regular characters, as Bendis intended to explore their reactions to the fate of their adult selves. The team was the main focus of the Battle of the Atom crossover, some months later. Bendis also used them for crossovers with the Guardians of the Galaxy and Miles Morales, that he also wrote. This was one of the few crossovers between the Marvel Universe and the Ultimate Marvel universe; Bendis preferred to write them sparingly. All-New X-Men has a vol. 2 in 2015, by Dennis Hopeless and Mark Bagley. The comic was cancelled after the end of the Inhumans vs. X-Men crossover, and the team was now published in the X-Men Blue comic. The teenager Jean also got a solo series after the end of ResurrXion, by Hopeless and Victor Ibanez, that explored her relation with the Phoenix Force. The teenager Cyclops joins the Champions, a comic book focused on teenager heroes but unrelated to the X-Men mythos. They guest-starred in the Venom comic, in the "Poison-X" arc. The story took the villains from the Venomverse arc and led to the Venomized crossover. The team were featured in the Extermination crossover, where they went back to their original timeline.
Ruins - Although the actual X-Men don't appear, alternate versions of its members and villains are shown to have suffered under horrific circumstances. Charles Xavier is a tyrannical President of the United States, Jean Grey is a prostitute, Magneto and Mystique die, Wolverine suffers from poisoning from his adamantium skeleton, Emma Frost heads the Church of the Next Generation and forces children of her followers to undergo surgery, Cyclops as well as Nightcrawler and Kitty Pryde are imprisoned at a Texas jail and Sabretooth is part of a fascist cannibalistic militia based in Oklahoma alongside Bucky Barnes and Jack Monroe.
 Ultimate X-Men – Set in the reimagined Ultimate Marvel universe. The X-Men are younger, wear black and gold uniforms and supernatural/cosmic elements are downplayed. Additionally Colossus is gay unlike his main universe counterpart, Magneto is not a Holocaust survivor and is more villainous, mutants were created by the Super-Soldier Serum, Cable is Wolverine and Kitty Pryde/Shadowcat dated Spider-Man.
 X-Men Forever – An alternate continuity diverging from X-Men, vol. 2 #3, continuing as though writer Chris Claremont had never left writing the series.
 X-Men Noir – Set in the 1930s, with the X-Men as a mysterious criminal gang and the Brotherhood as a secret society of corrupt cops.
 X-Men: The End – A possible ending to the X-Men's early 2005 status quo.
 X-Men '92 – Follows "Secret Wars", the X-Men of the 1992 TV Series, received their own comic book series.

In other media

The X-Men team has featured in multiple forms of media including the 20th Century Fox live-action film series, multiple animated shows, live-action shows, multiple video games, numerous novels, motion comics, soundtracks, action figures, and clothing.

See also
 List of Marvel Comics superhero debuts
 Doom Patrol, a similar team of super-powered misfits appearing in comics published by DC Comics.
 Harbingers/Psiots, another group of superpowered outcasts appearing in comics published by Valiant Comics.

References

Further reading 
 
 
  Note: Contains a chapter on the X-Men, with special emphasis on Jewish characters Magneto and Shadowcat.

External links

 
 
 
 

 
1963 comics debuts
Civil rights movement in popular culture
Marvel Comics American superheroes
Comics characters introduced in 1963
Characters created by Jack Kirby
Characters created by Stan Lee
Comics adapted into animated series
Evolution in popular culture
Marvel Entertainment franchises
Marvel Comics adapted into films
Marvel Comics adapted into video games
Marvel Comics superhero teams
Marvel Comics mutants
Marvel Comics titles
Mutants in fiction
X-Men supporting characters
X-Men titles